The chuk (hangul: 축; hanja: 柷) is a traditional Korean musical instrument used in Confucian (Munmyo) and Royal Ancestral Shrine (Jongmyo) ceremonies to signal the beginning of a ritual music performance. It is played at the beginning of music, meaning that the music begins by opening the sky and the ground. It consists of a square wooden box, played by striking the bottom with a mallet to mark beats or sections. The chuk is derived from the Chinese zhu, and was imported from China during the Goryeo Dynasty.

See also
Traditional Korean musical instruments

References 
 Korea.net Gateway to Korea

References

Idiophones
Korean musical instruments